The 2017 Geelong Football Club season was the club's 118th season of senior competition in the Australian Football League (AFL). The club also fielded its reserves team in the Victorian Football League (VFL) for the 18th season. It was also the first time the club fielded a women's team, with the club joining the VFL Women's competition.

Overview 
After retiring as a player at the end of the 2016 season, Corey Enright joined the coaching panel as an assistant coach, replacing Blake Caracella who moved to a senior assistant coaching role with Richmond. Former Western Bulldogs player Brad Johnson also had a short-term specialist coaching role working with the club's forwards during the preseason.

Season summary

Regular season

Ladder

Honours

Milestones
 Round 1 - Brandan Parfitt (AFL debut), Tom Stewart (AFL debut), Zach Tuohy (Geelong debut)
 Round 3 - James Parsons (AFL debut)
 Round 5 - Aaron Black (Geelong debut)

Others
 Round 3 - Brandan Parfitt (2017 AFL Rising Star nomination)

VFL Women's team 

2017 was the first season of women's Australian rules football contested by the Geelong Football Club, with the club competing in the second season of the VFL Women's competition, after failing to secure a licence to compete in the inaugural AFL Women's competition that began in 2017.

Background 
The first season of the VFL Women's (VFLW) league was held in 2016, and consisted of ten teams from the now-defunct Victorian Women's Football League.

In October 2016, Geelong announced that they would be taking over the licence to operate a VFL Women's team, replacing the Geelong Magpies who had competed in the 2016 season.

Season summary
Paul Hood was appointed the club's inaugural VFLW coach, having previously coached Geelong's VFL team in 2015. Rebecca Goring was appointed captain, with Madeleine Boyd and Lily Mithen named as co-vice captains. Mithen won the club's VFLW best and fairest award for the season.
The club would finish the season fifth on the ladder, not qualifying for the finals.

Results

Ladder

Awards 

 Best & Fairest: Lily Mithen
 VFL Women’s Team of the Year: Richelle Cranston , Lily Mithen

Notes 
 Key

 H ^ Home match.
 A ^ Away match.

 Notes
Geelong's scores are indicated in bold font.

References

External links
 Official website of the Geelong Football Club
 Official website of the Australian Football League

2016
Geelong Football Club